Gobichettipalayam taluk is a taluk of Erode district of the Indian state of Tamil Nadu. The headquarters of the taluk is the town of Gobichettipalayam. Recently, this taluk together with Sathyamangalam Taluk was reorganised to form Nambiyur Taluk.

Demographics
According to the 2011 census, the taluk of Gobichettipalayam had a population of 376,209 with 186,702  males and 189,507 females. There were 1015 women for every 1000 men. The taluk had a literacy rate of 64.97. Child population in the age group below 6 was 13,736 Males and 13,469 Females.

Constituents
Gobichettipalayam taluk consists of one municipality, nine panchayat towns and 55 panchayat villages. The following are the constituents:

Municipality
Gobichettipalayam

Panchayat towns

Panchayat villages

Akkarai Kodiveri
Alukuli
Ammapalayam
Andipalayam
Anjanur
Arrakkankottaigramam
Avalampalayam
Ayalur
Chandrapuram
Emmampoondi
Gudakkarai
Irugalur
Kadasellipalayam
Kadathur
Kadukkampalayam
Kalingiyam
Kanakampalayam
Karattupalayam
Kavandampalayam
Kondayampalayam
Kongarpalayam
Korakkattur
Koshanam
Kottupullampalayam
Kugalur
Kullampalayam
Kurumandur
Lagampalayam
Mevani
Modachur
Mottanam
Nagadevampalayam
Nanjai Gobi
Nanjai Puliampatti
Nathipalayam
Nichampalayam
Odayagoundanpalayam
Olalakovil
Pariyur
Perumugai
Perundalaiyur
Polavapalayam
Polavakalipalayam
Pullappanaickenpalayam
Punjaithuraipalayam
Puthukkarai
Santhipalayam
Savandapur
Singiripalayam
Sinnaripalayam
Siruvalur
Sundakkampalayam
Talguni
Vellalapalayam
Vellankoil
Vemandampalayam

References 

Taluks of Erode district
Gobichettipalayam